Atalaya  is a city in Buenos Aires Province, Argentina, in the Magdalena Partido.

References 

Populated places in Buenos Aires Province